The  was a French automobile manufactured only in 1899.  A light rear-engined voiturette, it featured three-seater bodywork.

References
 David Burgess Wise, The New Illustrated Encyclopedia of Automobiles.

Defunct motor vehicle manufacturers of France